László Kiss (born 12 March 1956) is a Hungarian football coach and former forward.

Kiss was born at Taszár. He played for the Hungary national team in the 1982 World Cup, where he gained notability after becoming the first substitute player to score three goals in a World Cup match.

Palmarès

ETF2L Open: Season 42

External links

1956 births
Living people
Hungarian footballers
Hungarian expatriate footballers
1982 FIFA World Cup players
Pécsi MFC players
Kaposvári Rákóczi FC players
Vasas SC players
Montpellier HSC players
MTK Budapest FC players
Budapesti VSC footballers
Hungarian football managers
Hungary international footballers
Sportspeople from Somogy County
Expatriate footballers in France
Hungarian expatriate sportspeople in France
Ligue 2 players
Women's national association football team managers
Association football forwards